Embrujo en Cerros Blancos is a 1955 Argentine film.

Cast
 Elisa Galvé		
 Rolando Chávez		
 Raúl del Valle		
 Liana Noda		
 Nathán Pinzón

External links

References

1955 films
1950s Spanish-language films
Argentine black-and-white films
1950s Argentine films